This is a chronological list of Australia T20Is wicket-keepers.

This list only includes players who have played as the designated keeper for a match. On occasions, another player may have stepped in to relieve the primary wicket-keeper due to injury or the keeper bowling.

Statistics are correct as of 4 November 2022.

See also
List of Australia Twenty20 International cricketers
List of Australia ODI wicket-keepers
List of Australia Test wicket-keepers

References

Australia Twenty20 International cricketers
Twenty20 International
Australia
Wicket-keepers